Manawatū-Whanganui is a region in the North Island of New Zealand. It contains numerous small rural primary schools, some small town primary and secondary schools, and city schools in the Wanganui and Palmerston North areas.

In New Zealand schools, students begin formal education in Year 1 at the age of five. Year 13 is the final year of secondary education. Years 14 and 15 refer to adult education facilities. 
State schools are those fully funded by the government and at which no fees for tuition of domestic students (i.e. New Zealand citizens and permanent residents, and Australian citizens) can be charged, although a donation is commonly requested. A state integrated school is a former private school with a special character based on a religious or philosophical belief that has been integrated into the state system. State integrated schools charge "attendance dues" to cover the building and maintenance of school buildings, which are not owned by the government, but otherwise they like state schools cannot charge fees for tuition of domestic students but may request a donation. Private schools charge fees to its students for tuition, as do state and state integrated schools for tuition of international students.

The socioeconomic decile indicates the socioeconomic status of the school's catchment area. A decile of 1 indicates the school draws from a poor area; a decile of 10 indicates the school draws from a well-off area. The decile ratings used here come from the Ministry of Education Te Kete Ipurangi website and from the decile change spreadsheet listed in the references. The deciles were last revised using information from the 2006 Census. The roll of each school changes frequently as students start school for the first time, move between schools, and graduate. The rolls given here are those provided by the Ministry of Education are based on figures from November 2012. The Ministry of Education institution number links to the Education Counts page for each school.

Ruapehu District
All schools in the Ruapehu district are coeducational.

Closed schools
Kakahi School closed in April 2016 after 106 years.

Kirikau School closed in 2013 after 85 years.

Whanganui District

Closed schools
Aramoho School closed at the end of 2016 after 143 years.

Rangitikei District

Manawatū District

Palmerston North City

Tararua District

Closed schools
Waitahora School 1903–2002
Motea School 1916–2002
Awariki School (opened 1904), Ormondville School (opened 1878), and Matamau School (opened 1887) merged into Norsewood School in 2003.
Kohinui School, Kohinui, closed in January 2008 and merged with Kumeroa-Hopelands School.
 Tiraumea School, closed January 2012.
Wimbledon School, Wimbledon.
Akitio school, closed on 27 Jan 2014. Reunion held on 25–28 March 2016.
Mangamairei country school, closed in mid 2015. A 130th reunion was held at the school.
Hillcrest School, closed in April 2019 due to its low roll.

Horowhenua District

Notes

References
Te Kete Ipurangi Ministry of Education website
ERO school and early childhood education reports Education Review Office
Decile change 2007 to 2008 for state & state integrated schools

 
Lists of schools in New Zealand